Jorge Augusto Santos Nogueira (born 29 September 1942) is a former Portuguese professional footballer.

Career statistics

Club

Notes

References

External links

1942 births
Living people
Portuguese footballers
Portugal youth international footballers
Association football defenders
Segunda Divisão players
S.L. Benfica footballers
S.C. Covilhã players